Auvia Air is a cargo airline based in East Jakarta, Indonesia. It was established and started operations in 2004 and operates cargo services.

Fleet 

As of January 2005 the Auvia Air fleet includes:

1 Boeing 737-200

References 

Defunct airlines of Indonesia
Airlines established in 2004
Indonesian companies established in 2004
Cargo airlines of Indonesia